My Shameful was a doom/death metal band with Finnish, German and American members. The band also had heavy funeral doom influences. Originating as a two-person studio project in Finland during the year 1999, they have recorded three demos and six albums. The demos were recorded with Sami Rautio and Harri Jussila as participating members. The line-up was completed in 2004 with drummer Mark Napier, bassist Twist, and guitar player Mario. My Shameful parted ways with Mark Napier in spring of 2007, due to Mark's difficulties with live shows, a new drummer was found in Jürgen Fröhling.

During the year 2008 My Shameful recorded their fourth full-length studio album "Descend". Due to Sami Rautio moving back to Finland, the album was recorded in several different locations.

In 2013 came out the self-released album Penance

In 2014 the band signed deal with Russians MFL-Records to release their new album "Hollow" which came out in November 2014.

Discography

Albums
 Of All the Wrong Things (2003)
 ...of Dust (2004)
 The Return to Nothing (2006)
 Descend (2008)
 Penance (2013)
 Hollow (2014)

EPs
 To All I Hated (2002)

Demos
 Sown in Sadness (2000)
 Your Dark Overwhelming (2000)
 To All I Hated (2000)

External links
Official website
 

Finnish doom metal musical groups
Musical groups established in 1999
Musical quartets